This list of waterbodies of Haute-Corse includes static bodies of water (lakes, reservoirs, coastal lagoons) and flowing bodies of water (rivers and streams) in the department of Haute-Corse on the island of Corsica.

Static waterbodies

Natural lakes 

Lakes in the Monte Cinto massif include:

 Lac d'Argento
 Lac du Ceppu 
 Lac du Cinto
 Lac de Ghiarghe Rosse
 Lac de Lancone Sottano
 Lac Maggiore
 Lac de la Muvrella
 Lac d'Occhi Neri
 Lac de la Paglia Orba

Lakes in the Monte Rotondo massif include:

 Lac de Bettaniella ou lac du Rotondo
 Lac de Capitellu
 Lac de Cavacciole 
 Lac de Galiera
 Étang de Gialicatapiano
 Lac de Goria
 Lac de Lavigliolu
 Lac de Melu
 Lac de Nino
 Lac de l'Oriente
 Grand lac d'Oro
 Petit lac d'Oro
 Lac de Pozzolo
 Grand lac de Rinoso
 Petit lac de Rinoso
 Lac de San Ciprianu
 Lac de Scapuccioli
 Lac de Soglia
 Lac de Sorbi

Lakes in the Monte Renoso massif include:

 Lac d'Alzeta
 Lac de Bastani
 Lac de Nielluccio
 Lac de Rina Soprano
 Lac de Rina Sottano

Artificial reservoirs

Artificial reservoirs built to store water for drinking, irrigation or hydroelectric power generation include:

 Alesani
 Alzitone
 Argentella
 Bacciana (alt. 54 m)
 Calacuccia
 Calca Tavulaghjiu
 Codole
 Corscia (673 m)
 Padula
 Peri
 Sampolo
 Teppe Rosse
 Trévadine

Coastal lagoons

 Étang de Biguglia 
 Étang de Crovani 
 Étang de Diane
 Étang de Palo
 Étang del Sale
 Étang d'Urbino

Rivers and streams

Rivers and streams  in Haute-Corse are listed below in clockwise sequence, from west to north to east to south, with their main tributaries.

West coast

 Fango
 Figarella
 Seccu
 Regino
 Ostriconi
 Liscu
 Santu
 Buggiu
 Aliso

Cap Corse

 Fium'Albino
 Olmeta
 Guadu Grande
 Acqua Tignese
 Luri
 Pietracorbara
 Sisco 
 Poggiolo

East coast

 Bevinco
 Golo
 Asco 
 Tartagine
 Casaluna 
 Erco
 Fium'Alto
 Buccatoggio
 Alesani
 Alistro
 Chiosura
 Bravone
 Tavignano
 Corsiglièse
 Restonica 
 Tagnone
 Vecchio 
 Fiumorbo
 Saltaruccio 
 Varagno
 Abatesco
 Aglia 
 Travo
 Chiola
 Solenzara

See also
List of waterbodies of Corse-du-Sud

 
Lists of bodies of water